Scelotes montispectus, the Bloubergstrand dwarf burrowing skink, is a species of lizard which is endemic to South Africa.

References

montispectus
Reptiles of South Africa
Reptiles described in 2003
Taxa named by Aaron M. Bauer
Taxa named by Alison S. Whiting
Taxa named by Ross Allen Sadlier